Melvindale High School is a public school located within Melvindale, Michigan, which is in the Downriver area. This school is offered to students that are in grades 9-12. It is within the Melvindale-Northern Allen Park School District and it also serves northern portions of Allen Park.

History
Melvindale High School was first built as a one-room school house in 1882. In 1923, the second room for this school house was added on. Since the population of the surrounding area grew, many bonds were granted to the district and Quandt School (MHS's former name) was finally established by 1927. Now, there are four schools within the district: Melvindale High School (9-12), Strong Middle School (6-8), Allendale Elementary (2-5), and Rogers Early Elementary (K-1).

In a period prior to 1950, Melvindale was one of the schools serving high school students from the Allen Park School District. That year, Allen Park High School opened.

Athletics
Melvindale High School is a member of the Downriver League. Sports offered here are: Basketball (Boys & Girls), Baseball (Boys), Wrestling (Boys), Volleyball (Girls), Track and field (Boys & Girls), Cheerleading (Girls), Softball (Girls), Bowling (Boys & Girls), Football (Boys), and Soccer (Boys & Girls). Their major sports rival is with Allen Park High School. The rivalry between these two schools is called "The Battle of Two Brothers". Allen Park is considered the "Big Brother" in this rivalry because it is a bigger school in a bigger city, Melvindale High School is the "Little Brother". Allen Park, Michigan neighbors Melvindale.

Notable alumni
 Al Cicotte, played Major League Baseball with the New York Yankees, Minnesota Twins, Detroit Tigers, Cleveland Indians, St. Louis Cardinals, and Houston Astros.
 William D. Ford, U.S. Representative from Michigan
 Mickey Goodwin (class of 1976), professional boxer.

References

Educational institutions in the United States with year of establishment missing
Public high schools in Michigan
Schools in Wayne County, Michigan
Educational institutions established in 1882
1882 establishments in Michigan